Alive is a 2014 South Korean drama film starring Park Jung-bum and Lee Seung-yeon. Written and directed by Park, it tells the story of a broke laborer's struggle for survival.

After his friend's suicide, Park was troubled and started asking questions, such as why he was unable to help his friend and how he can help himself as he also suffers from panic disorder. He concluded that humans should save humans. Although everyone may look like they're leading different lives, finding hope within everything is what he wanted his film to focus on.

It made its world premiere as one of the feature-length films for Jeonju Digital Project at the Jeonju International Film Festival in 2014. Since then, the film had a good start in the film festival scene, winning the Young Critics Award at the 67th Locarno International Film Festival, followed by a double crown for the Silver Astor for Best Actor Award and Obra Cine Award for Best First or Second Feature at the 29th Mar del Plata International Film Festival, a special mention at the 25th Singapore International Film Festival along with numerous other international film festival invites.

Plot
Jung-chul, a laborer, toils away on a soybean paste factory as he tries to look after his dysfunctional family.

Cast
 Park Jung-bum as Jung-chul
 Lee Seung-yeon as Soo-yeon
 Park Myung-hoon as Myung-hoon
 Shin Haet-bit as Ha-na
 Park Hee-von as Hyun-kyung
 Lee Na-ra as Jin-young

Production
Filming starts in December 2011 in a small town in the mountainous Gangwon Province of Korea, where Park Jung-bum's parents live and run a small soybean paste factory, which acts as the main location for the film.

Awards and nominations

References

External links
 
 
 

2014 films
2010s Korean-language films
Films directed by Park Jung-bum
South Korean drama films
2014 drama films
2010s South Korean films